Gun Street is a 1961 American Western film directed by Edward L. Cahn and starring James Brown, Jean Willes and John Clarke.

Plot
Gary Wells (Warren Kemmerling), a violent criminal sentenced to the death penalty, escapes from prison and vows revenge against those he blames for his capture. Local sheriff Chuck Morton (James Brown) is tasked with warning Wells' likely victims. At the top of Morton's list are Wells' ex-wife, Janice (Peggy Stewart) ; her new husband, Dr. Dean Knudtson (John Pickard) ; and Jeff Baxley (Herb Armstrong), whose testimony in court helped convict Wells.

Cast
James Brown as Sheriff Chuck Morton 
 Jean Willes as Joan Brady
 John Clarke as Deputy Sheriff Sam Freed
 John Pickard as Dr. Knudson 
 Med Flory as Willie Driscoll
 Peggy Stewart as Mrs. Knudson 
 Sandra Stone as Pat Wells 
 Warren J. Kemmerling as Gary Wells (as Warren Kemmerling)
 Nesdon Booth as Mayor Phillips 
 Herb Armstrong as Jeff Baxley
 Renny McEvoy as Operator

See also
 List of American films of 1961

References

External links

1961 films
1960s English-language films
American black-and-white films
1961 Western (genre) films
American Western (genre) films
Films directed by Edward L. Cahn
Films produced by Edward Small
Films scored by Richard LaSalle
United Artists films
1960s American films